Korarou  is a rural commune of the Cercle of Douentza in the Mopti Region of Mali. The commune contains nine villages and according to the 2009 census, it has a population of 3,539. The principal village (chef-lieu) is Diona.

References

External links
.
.

Communes of Mopti Region